SEIU Healthcare is a Canadian trade union representing more than 60,000 workers in Ontario, Canada. Through collective bargaining, the union represents workers in hospitals, home care, nursing and retirement homes, and community services. The union has been active in Ontario for over 70 years.

SEIU Healthcare is distinct from SEIU Local 2 Canada, albeit both SEIU Healthcare and Local 2 are affiliated with SEIU.

After several years of pressure from its parent union SEIU and its campaign to restructure  including merging eight Canadian SEIU locals into a mega Local 1. Instead, The merger was mired with controversy, with 8 SEIU locals representing 30,000 members (half of SEIU members in Ontario) voting to disaffiliate from the SEIU and join the Canadian Auto Workers (CAW) instead. SEIU responded by placing six of the locals under trusteeship, and prevented them from transferring en masse. CAW responded by raiding individual bargaining units over 181 union raid elections. This resulted in a loss of 14,000 SEIU members, which led to allegations by the Canadian Labour Congress that CAW was raiding.

Since 2004, the union's governing structure and membership servicing has been based on a mega-local and business union model. SEIU's organizational structure and leadership has been criticized by several labour activists as undemocratic and bureaucratic.

The majority of SEIU Healthcare's units do not have the right to strike, as they are bound by Ontario's Hospital Labour Disputes Arbitration Act (HLDAA).

SEIU Healthcare's constitution does not provide any unit autonomy, and gives a significant amount of executive power to its officers. SEIU International itself has recognized this criticism.

In 2013, SEIU Local 1 Ontario rebranded itself and changed its name to SEIU Healthcare to publicly appeal to the patients, residents and clients that are taken care of by SEIU workers in the healthcare sector.

History 

Originally known as the Building Service Employees International Union, the Canadian division of the union established its first two locals in Montreal and Vancouver in 1943. Members at these two locals were mainly elevator operators, window cleaners, janitors and other maintenance employees in commercial buildings.

SEIU started organizing healthcare workers in Ontario hospitals in the early 1940s. SEIU continued its efforts and formed Canada's first hospital local at the Toronto General Hospital in 1944, and went on to organize four hospitals in Thunder Bay in 1946.

SEIU continued to expand in hospitals and nursing homes. Throughout the 1980s, SEIU campaigned to protect nursing home jobs from outsourcing, advocated for pension plans for thousands of nursing home workers worth over $304 million in assets, and helped stop the Ontario Government from passing a law that would restrict yearly wage increases.

In the mid-1990s, SEIU took the Ontario Government to court after the Progressive Conservatives tried to limit Ontario's pay equity legislation. This legal action pressured the government in June 2003 to commit up to $414 million in pay equity funding for 100,000 women across Ontario.

1998–2004: CAW "raids" and the mega-merger 

By the end of the 1990s, SEIU International began restructuring. The union called for locals, including those in Canada, to merge into mega-locals. SEIU International believed a mega-local structure would effectively challenge more employers, transform the existing political climate, and also address SEIU Canada's internal problems. However, the call for a mega-merger came with the cost of transforming the union into a top-down, business union as it sacrificed bottom-up, rank-and-file driven union democracy. Then-SEIU International President Andy Stern argues that bargaining units "with less than 100,000 members lacked the power to effectively deal with employers or governments", even at the cost of democratic decision-making. Although merging existing SEIU locals makes the union less democratic, Stern argues that it's a necessary change to address growing economic issues and membership decline. According to Stern, "Workers want their lives to be changed. They want strength and a voice, not some purist, intellectual, historical, mythical democracy. Workers can win when they are united, and leaders who stand in the way of change screaming "democracy" are failing to understand how workers exercise the limited power they have..."

Instead of merging the locals or defecting to other unions, in 1998, SEIU's Canadian leadership, including the national executive board and local presidents, created a working group to examine ways to address the political and economic challenges, improve servicing, and strengthen SEIU's structure in Canada. Dubbed the "November Group", this body put forward a proposal that would give SEIU Canada and its locals greater autonomy in its decision-making, financial structures and the establishment of their strategic goals.

The November group's proposals, however, were not accepted by SEIU International, and the latter decided to forcefully merge the locals without consent. Backed by SEIU's International Constitution which permits merging locals together as it sees fit, Canadian locals had no choice. As a result, on February 20, 2000, a meeting of executive committee members from the eight SEIU locals in Ontario was convened where the unanimous decision was made to propose to the existing 30,000 members to leave SEIU and join CAW. Then-CAW President Buzz Hargrove described frustration due to "dictatorial leadership from Washington, poor service, and a fundamental lack of control over their Canadian affairs."

SEIU International responded by immediately placing all eight locals under trusteeship. All staff members from the locals were dismissed, as were all members of the executive committees. A $3.7 million lawsuit was launched by the International against the executive committee members of the eight locals. SEIU International then appointed Sharleen Stewart as the new Canadian vice-president.

On March 2, 2000, the day that the proposed defecting vote was to be held, SEIU International obtained an injunction from the Ontario Superior Court of Justice to render the vote non-binding. Nonetheless, the vote took place and about 11,000 members of the Ontario SEIU locals cast ballots to leave SEIU. Then, between March 2000 and March 2001, 180 SEIU bargaining units, representing over 14,000 members, left the SEIU and joined the CAW. These decertification votes averaged around 95% in favour of switching to the CAW. Buzz Hargrove defended CAW's actions, saying that they had "no choice but to honour the expressed will of those who had overwhelmingly voted to leave SEIU". Despite members voting in favour of leaving SEIU, the CAW was sanctioned by the Canadian Labour Congress for raiding.

In October 2003, the six remaining locals voted to merge their healthcare and community-service members into one provincial local named SEIU Local 1.on. SEIU International issued a charter for SEIU Local 1.on on January 8, 2004 and approved the new local's constitution on March 26, 2004.

2013-Present: Rebranding as Canada's Healthcare Union 
In 2013, SEIU Local 1.on changed its name to "SEIU Healthcare", and rebranded its logo and slogan to appeal to patients, residents and clients under the care of SEIU workers. President Stewart believed this transformation was as a move towards being a "21st-century, solution-based union; a union that all members know makes their lives better; a union that teaches employers and governments that the labour movement is a valued partner, not an opponent."

This move has further established SEIU Healthcare as a business union, which sees the need to play a larger role cooperating with employers and government agencies. As the Canadian Business Journal writes, "SEIU Healthcare is looking to partner with the government and seeks their support to address the shift in demographics with [private sector] and [not-for-profit] homecare being a great opportunity to offset some of the expenses incurred from traditional healthcare." The business union approach has been criticised by notable labour activists and scholars such as Kim Moody, who writes that "while more unions today employ mobilization tactics, there is still often a tendency to keep things under bureaucratic control. Since most organizing as it is currently done is administered by the international unions, bureaucratic business unionism, still the norm, is a barrier to effective struggle.

Political Action and Affiliations
Over the last decade, SEIU Healthcare has increased its focus on electoral politics. The union played an important role in the 2014 Ontario provincial elections by helping elect former Ontario Liberal Party leader Kathleen Wynne. During both the 2014 and 2018 voting cycles, SEIU mobilized hundreds of members across the province to contact voters in key ridings and to encourage them to strategically vote and support the candidate who was most likely to strengthen Ontario's public healthcare system and improve collective bargaining rights.

While SEIU leadership advocates for strategic voting, the union has regularly donated to the Liberal Party of Ontario. Michael Spitale, SEIU Healthcare's former director of government relations, was acclaimed as the President of the Ontario Liberal Party in November 2016, but resigned after less than a year.

SEIU Healthcare affiliates with the Ontario Federation of Labour and the Canadian Labour Congress.

Governing Structure and Leadership
Sharleen Stewart has been president of SEIU Healthcare for almost two decades after she was appointed by SEIU International as the Canadian vice-president in 2003. Her appointment was controversial and met with criticism. Stewart did not stand before the membership in a democratic election until 2007. Although elections are now held every four years, critics allege that the 2004 constitution imposed by SEIU International, and the initial undemocratic appointment of President Stewart has left a legacy by making it difficult for rank and file members to run for top leadership positions. This is confirmed by SEIU's constitution, as articles 3, 4, and 5 provide the president with a significant amount of executive power, and has restrictive criteria for members interested in running for leadership.

In September 2018, Tyler Downey, SEIU Healthcare's former director of Leadership and Development, Deputy Chief of Staff, and Field Organizer, was appointed by President Stewart as the Secretary-Treasurer. Downey is the first person of colour to hold the Secretary-Treasurer position. In June 2019, Mina Amrith, a former Registered Practical Nurse (RPN) at Sunnybrook Health Sciences Centre in Toronto, and a long-time women's advocate, was appointed as the executive vice-president. Amrith is SEIU's first woman of colour Executive Vice-President. Amrith also sits on the Ontario Federation of Labour executive board.

SEIU Healthcare played an important role electing former Ontario Liberal Party leader Kathleen Wynne in 2014. Michael Spitale, President of the Ontario Liberal Party between 2016 and 2017, was SEIU Healthcare's director of government relations and chief lobbyist.

SEIU Healthcare's governance structure consists of three officers (president, vice-president, treasurer-secretary) and 17 executive board members. In the event of a vacancy, under article 5.8 of the constitution, the president can appoint a vice-president or treasurer-secretary without a vote from the membership or executive board. In 2015, the union restructured its executive board to include seven seats specifically for equity-seeking groups: workers of colour, LGBTQ, persons with disability, retirees, young workers, women and aboriginal/indigenous.

Compared to other Canadian unions such as Unifor, CUPE, Teamsters Canada, UFCW, PSAC, and LIUNA, SEIU units have little local autonomy. SEIU officers have a significant executive power and ability to override decisions made by the membership and internal staff, as provided under Article 5 of the constitution. Article 3.8 of the constitution prevents members from publicly criticizing the leadership and its strategy.

President Stewart believes that the union's top-down, business-like structure allows SEIU Healthcare to do their "business in an efficient and timely manner, which speed up [the] decision-making process within the union structure." Former executive Vice President Carol McDowell similarly claims that "Unions operate very much like a business; we are mandated to serve our members. We are professional and skilled and we know our business. We see ourselves as experts in the healthcare industry which is what we are specialized in."

As stipulated under articles 4.7 and 4.8 of SEIU Healthcare's Constitution, "No person shall be eligible for nomination as an officer, member of the board, or any other office of the Local Union who has not been a member in continuously good standing for at least two (2) years; to be eligible to run for any of the top three officer positions, the member must have served at least one full term on the Executive Board", and "No person who has been convicted of an indictable offence in Canada shall, in accordance with the provisions of applicable law, be eligible to hold office in this Local Union."

SEIU's top-down, mega-local structure, and business union model has been criticized by labour activists who call on unions to be more democratic, accountable and grassroots-driven. As Kim Moody writes, business unionism relies on a centralized bureaucracy that is separate and unaccountable to the union rank and file.

SEIU International itself has recognized these criticisms. In an independent study commissioned by SEIU, the researchers write that "SEIU's view is that to be able to organize large numbers of new members in an advanced society, the union needs the structure to match the multinational corporations it engages and the discipline of an army. This leads to criticism both within and without that SEIU is both too top down and too corporate."

Nursing Division 
SEIU Healthcare has a dedicated nursing division that holds its own convention and has a separate governing board, constitution and professional liaison staff. The division advocates for nursing in Ontario regarding professional practices, scope of practice and delivery of care by nurses. The Nursing Division Board is led by President Jackie Walker, and consists of three Vice Presidents (Hospital, Home & Community Care, and Long-Term Care) and eight regional representations.

Current Officers 
Sharleen Stewart (President, 2004–current)
Tyler Downey (Secretary-Treasurer, 2018–current)
Mina Amrith (Executive Vice-President, 2019–current)
Jackie Walker (Nursing Division President, 2012–current)

Internal organization 
Following a business union model, SEIU Healthcare's administration is divided into several sectors and departments led by sector directors or department heads. This includes: Long-Term Care, Hospitals, Community Care, Finance, Research, Human Resources, Communications, Education, Internal Organizing, and External Organizing. The Union also has a Social Justice Capacity Builder, a director of Leadership and Development, a director for Governmental Relations, and a Head of Policy and Public affairs. The union is managed by the Chief of Staff and Deputy Chief of Staff.

While the head office is located in Richmond Hill, there are regional offices in Barrie, Ottawa, St. Catharines, London, North Bay and Thunder Bay.

Internal labour relations
SEIU Healthcare's employees are organized and represented by two unions. Staff representatives, events coordinators, field organizers, communication reps, research associates, education reps, brand journalists, media specialists, web architects and member resource centre reps are all unionized by Teamsters Local 879. Administrative assistants, accounting clerks, mailroom clerks, receptionists and all general office staff are unionized by the United Steelworkers.

In 2007, fifty field staff employed by local 1.on, and represented by the Teamsters Local 879, went on strike against perceived concessions demanded by Stewart and SEIU management. While the strike ended after management capitulated, it has been alleged that the chief steward and all the strikers from the Organizing Department were fired, except for those who crossed the picket line. At the time, President Stewart and SEIU's management team were accused of reprisal and retribution.

While there have been no labour disruptions within SEIU Healthcare since 2007, allegations of despotism, poor management, staff exploitation and membership negligence persist in both the Canadian and American SEIU affiliates.

SEIU Healthcare's constitution provides its president with broad executive powers to interfere in the affairs of all internal labour relations. As per article 5.1, "The President shall have the authority to hire and fire staff as necessary, and to retain counsel, accountants, professional and other personnel as may be required to assist in the duties of the office and to fix their compensation."

See also
Business unionism
Labor aristocracy

References

Bibliography
Moody, Kim. An Injury to All: The Decline of American Unionism, San Francisco, CA, & Chelsea, MI: Verso, 1988. .

External links
 SEIU Healthcare
 SEIU International

Service Employees International Union